A tome or codex is a large book, especially one volume of a multi-volume scholarly work. 

Tome may also refer to:

Places
 Tome, Miyagi, city in Japan (formerly Tome District)
Tome, New Mexico, an unincorporated community and census-designated place in New Mexico
 Tome-Adelino, New Mexico, a former census-designated place in New Mexico

People
 Töme (born 1997), Canadian singer
 Gianfranco Labarthe Tome (born 1984), Peruvian footballer
 Jacob Tome (1810–1898), American philanthropist, founder of the Tome School
 Maria Tomé, São Toméan politician
 Norman Tome (born 1973), Australian football player
 Philippe Tome, pseudonym used by writer Philippe Vandevelde
Tome H. Walters Jr., American Air Force General
Tomé (Angolan footballer) (born 1998)
Tomé (Portuguese footballer) (born 1986)

Games
 The Linux Game Tome, games website
 Makai Kingdom: Chronicles of the Sacred Tome, video game
 ToME (Tales of Middle Earth), video game
 Tales of Maj'Eyal (ToME 4), a Roguelike computer game
 one of several rulebooks for Dungeons & Dragons:
 Tome of Magic, handbook of rules and guidelines for Dungeons & Dragons
 Tome of Battle: The Book of Nine Swords, rule supplement for Dungeons & Dragons
 Tome and Blood, optional rulebook for Dungeons & Dragons

Other
 Tome's spiny rat, Central-American spiny rat
 Tome School, prep school in North East, Maryland
 TV Tome, United States website for television information
 Tome Sculptures, album by band Agathodaimon
 Tome cheese, French cheese produced in the Alpine region
 TOME: Terrain of Magical Expertise, an animated web series by Chris Niosi

See also
 Rotonda di San Tomè (Italian: Rotunda of St. Thomas), church in the comune of Almenno San Bartolomeo, in the province of Bergamo, Lombardy, Italy
 Tomos (Eastern Orthodox Church)
 Tomé (disambiguation)
 Tomb